Ian Strachan may refer to:

Ian Strachan (minister), Scottish missionary and educator in Ghana
Ian Strachan (Newfoundland and Labrador politician) (born 1940), former Canadian politician in Newfoundland and Labrador
Ian Strachan (Ontario politician) (1898–1964), Canadian politician in Ontario
Ian Strachan, president of the Edinburgh Mathematical Society
Ian Strachan, a defendant in the 2007 royal blackmail plot
Ian Strachan, British author of The Boy in the Bubble